Loudenvielle is a commune in the Hautes-Pyrénées department in south-western France. On 1 January 2016, the former commune Armenteule was merged into Loudenvielle.

Its inhabitants are called Loudenviellois.

Located in the Louron Valley, Loudenvielle is a popular tourist resort, with a lake, campsite, thermal spa and waterpark. It is also the closest town to the Peyragudes and Val-Louron ski resorts.

It is situated at the foot of the Col de Peyresourde and has hosted three stage finishes in the Tour de France, including the finish of Stage 15 in 2007.

Tour de France stage finishes

In the 2007 tour, the original stage winner was Alexander Vinokourov, but in April 2008 the win was credited to Kim Kirchen following Vinokourov's failing a drug test.

See also
Communes of the Hautes-Pyrénées department

References

External links
www.lelouron.com
 Loudenvielle - Le Louron dans le Tour de France 

Communes of Hautes-Pyrénées
Hautes-Pyrénées communes articles needing translation from French Wikipedia